Benny Dayal  (born 13 May 1984) is an Indian playback singer. He is a prominent singer in Hindi, Tamil, Telugu, Malayalam, Kannada, Bengali, Gujarati and Marathi and more languages films. He has sung more than 3500 songs in 19+ Indian languages. He is a member of the band S5, launched by SS Music TV channel. He made his acting debut in the Malayalam movie By the People, a suspense thriller. All the songs were sung by S5 members and it was then that A.R. Rahman noticed him and took an audition.

Personal life
Dayal's parents hail from Kollam district in Kerala. He was born and raised in Abu Dhabi, UAE and completed his schooling there from Abu Dhabi Indian School (ADIS). He went on to complete his B.Com. and Masters in Journalism from Madras Christian College.

Dayal worked as an Events Coordinator with RR Donnelley. He quit his job in BPO to accomplish his career with music. On 5 June 2016, the singer married his model girlfriend Catherine Thangam in a close-knit ceremony in Bengaluru.

Discography

Albums
 Isai
 Ithu Premamo
 Ithu Premamo 2
 Saaral (produced by Rainbow Bridge Studios)
 Swaasam (produced by Hexachord)
 Vazhkai DJ (Produced by Benny Dayal and Charles Bosco)

Hindi songs

Tamil songs

Telugu songs

Malayalam songs

Kannada songs

Bengali songs

Gujarati songs

Marathi songs

Urdu songs

Awards and honors 
Won
 54th Filmfare Awards – RD Burman Award for New Music Talent – "Kaise Mujhe" for (Ghajini)
 2009 Stardust Awards — Max Stardust Awards for New Musical Sensation – "Pappu Can't Dance" for (Jaane Tu Ya Jaane Na)
 Ananda vikadan cinema awards – Best playback singer – Make

Live performances
At Aura 2023,KLS GIT Belagavi,on 18 March 2023
At Vibrance 2023, VIT Chennai, on 3 March 2023
At IIT jodhpur, on 23 February 2020
At Riviera 2020, VIT Vellore, on 13 February 2020
At ECHOES 2020, IIM Kozhikode, on 8 February 2020
At Standard Chartered T&I,Annual Staff Day 2019 December,MGM beach Resorts,Chennai.
At Imperium 2019, Management Development Institute, Gurgaon
At Festember 2019, National Institute of technology, Tiruchirapalli
 At Shivaji College (vibration '19), New Delhi on 21 February 2019
 Ranchi Gymkhana club, Ranchi, 20 January 2019
 At Biocon Bangalore (Invivo 40), Bengaluru on 18 February 2019
 At IIM Bangalore (Unmaad – Cultural Fest), Bengaluru on 2 February 2019
 At Madras Christian College, Chennai on 24 January 2019.
 At Bacardi NH7 Weekender, Pune on 7 December 2018.
 Redbull Music festival,Kochi, 24 November 2018
 At Thapar University, Patiala on 19 November 2018.
 At Manpho Convention Center, Bangalore (AT&T Family Day "Odessey 2020") on 18 November 2018
 The Institute of Chartered Accountants of India, Abu Dhabi Chapter, 16 November 2018
 AIIMS Raipur on 28 October 2018
 At Mountain View, California (Gaana Music Festival) on 19 May 2018.
 At Vijayawada (K L University)Samyak 2018 on 24 March 2018.
 Crossroads 2018, Annual Cultural festival of Shri Ram College of Commerce, Delhi, on 18 March 2018.
 NITK Surathkal on 3 March 2018 as part of the cultural festival Incident 2018 (Day 3, Pro Shows)
 At Goa (Royal Enfield Raider Maniya)Live in concert on 19 November 2017.
 Manipal Institute of Technology on 11 March 2017 as part of Revels, the annual cultural festival of MIT.
 At IIT Hyderabad (ELAN- NVISION) Live in Concert on 21 January 2017
 2017– at world orange festival, Nagpur Maharashtra ... Nikhil.k
 Sri Jayachamarajendra College of Engineering, Mysuru at its annual cultural fest (Jayciana – 2016) on 22 April 2016
 Anaadyanta at the Nitte Meenakshi Institute of Technology, Bangalore on 5 March 2016
 At PBWA Powai Sarvajanin Durgotsav—Live in Concert on 21 October 2015
 Spirit of Wipro Run 2015 – Wipro Limited, Bangalore on 20 September 2015
 Zee London Mela – London, England on 6 September 2015
 In "Spandan'2015" conducted by JIPMER, Pondicherry on 2 September 2015 
 Canadian National Exhibition (CNE), Toronto, Canada on 23 August 2015
 Amrita School of Engineering, Coimbatore for Anokha '15 (Amrita's annual technical festival) on 7 March 2015
 Tech Mahindra Hyderabad annual fest Ekatvam in January 2015
  Infosys Limited, Bangalore, Indian Institute of Engineering Science and Technology, Shibpur for Rebeca '14 on 27 April 2014 
  JSS Academy of Technical Education, Bangalore at its annual Techno-Cultural Fest (VERVE – 2014) on 26 April 2014 
  Symbiosis Center for Management Studies at its annual Sympulse, in Pune, on 15 January 2014
  Annual Cultural Festival OASIS 2014 of Birla Institute of Technology & Science, Pilani
 Indian Institute of Foreign Trade in Delhi on 16 November 2013 at its annual management festival, Quo Vadis 
 Zephyr 2013, the annual cultural festival of Orissa Engineering College in Bhubaneswar
 2013 – Annual Cultural Fest, Siliguri Institute of Technology, Siliguri, West Bengal.
 Tezpur University at Techxetra on 27 October 2013 
 NIT Trichy on 29 September 2013
Institute of Medical Sciences,Banaras Hindu University (IMS, BHU,Varanasi)~  ELIXIR cultural event on 13 March 2013
 8th mile, RV college of engineering on 20 September 2011.Bangalore 
 Acharya Habba at the Acharya Institute of Technology, Bangalore on 9 April 2011
 Mar Baselios College of Engineering and Technology on 21 March 2010 as part of a cultural event
 SSN College of Engineering on 5 March 2010, with Stephen Devassy and others
 Shanmugha Arts, Science, Technology & Research Academy, Tanjore as a part of the cult fest Kuruksastra in 2009
 NIT Calicut on 26 March 2009 as part of the cultural festival Ragam '09

References

External links

1984 births
Living people
Musicians from Kollam
Singers from Kollam
Tamil playback singers
Bollywood playback singers
Indian male playback singers
Kannada playback singers
Artists from Kollam
Telugu playback singers
Singers from Kerala
Film musicians from Kerala
Indian expatriates in the United Arab Emirates
21st-century Indian singers
21st-century Indian male singers
People from Abu Dhabi